Xorides corcyrensis is a parasitoid wasp from ichneumonid family that parasitizes long-horned beetles of the Ropalopus varini.

References

Xoridinae
Insects described in 1894